Perrysburg may refer to some places in the United States:

Perrysburg, Indiana
Perrysburg, Ohio
Perrysburg Township, Wood County, Ohio
Perrysburg (town), New York
Perrysburg (CDP), New York

See also
 Perry (disambiguation)